Stenocerini is a tribe of fungus weevils in the subfamily of beetles known as Anthribinae. There are at least sixteen genera in Stenocerini.

Genera
The following genera are included in the tribe Stenocerini:
 Allandrus LeConte, 1876 i c g b
 Helmoreus 
 Stenocerus Schoenherr, 1826 i c g b
Data sources: i = ITIS, c = Catalogue of Life, g = GBIF, b = Bugguide.net

References

Further reading

 
 
 
 
 
 

Anthribidae
Articles created by Qbugbot